The Philosophy of Mathematics Education Journal is a peer-reviewed open-access academic journal published and edited by Paul Ernest (University of Exeter). It publishes articles relevant to the philosophy of mathematics education, a subfield of mathematics education that often draws in issues from the philosophy of mathematics. The journal includes articles, graduate student assignments, theses, and other pertinent resources.

Special issues of the journal have focussed on
 social justice issues in mathematics education, part 1 (issue no. 20, 2007)
 semiotics of mathematics education (issue no. 10, 1997)

See also 
 List of scientific journals in mathematics education

External links 
 

Philosophy journals
Open access journals
Publications established in 1990
English-language journals
Mathematics education journals
Mathematics education in the United Kingdom